Boron Air Force Station is a closed United States Air Force General Surveillance Radar station. It was closed by the Air Force in 1975 and turned over to the Federal Aviation Administration (FAA). The radar site is still operated by the FAA as part of the Joint Surveillance System (JSS).

History
Boron Air Force Station was one of twenty-eight stations built as part of the second segment of the Air Defense Command permanent radar network. Prompted by the start of the Korean War, Secretary of the Air Force Thomas K. Finletter asked Secretary of Defense Louis A. Johnson on 11 July 1950 for approval to expedite construction of the permanent network. Receiving approval 10 days later, the Air Force directed the Army Corps of Engineers to proceed with construction.

The 750th Aircraft Control and Warning Squadron was assigned to Atolia, California, on 28 January 1952.  It assumed coverage responsibilities formerly held by the temporary Lashup Radar Network site at Edwards Air Force Base (L-40). It operated two AN/FPS-10 radars and initially functioned as a ground-controlled interception (GCI) and warning station.  As a GCI station, the squadron's role was to guide interceptor aircraft toward unidentified intruders.  Atolia AFS was renamed Boron Air Force Station on 1 December 1953.

The AN/FPS-10 search radar at Boron remained until 1959. In 1958 an AN/FPS-6 replaced the AN/FPS-10 height finder radar. A second height finder radar (an AN/FPS-6A) was installed in 1959.

During 1961 Boron AFS joined the Semi-Automatic Ground Environment (SAGE) system, feeding data to DC-17 at Norton Air Force Base, California.  After joining, the squadron was redesignated as the 750th Radar Squadron (SAGE) on 1 May 1961. The radar squadron provided continuous information to the SAGE Direction Center, where it was analyzed to determine range, direction, altitude, speed, and whether aircraft were friendly or hostile.

A separate Ground Air Transmit Receive (GATR) site was located 3.5 miles NNW of the main site to provide some isolation from the high-powered RF energy from the search radar systems for the GATR's HF/VHF/UHF voice and data air-to-ground communications. GATR sites used voice communications via AN/GRT-3 transmitters and AN/GRR-7 receivers to guide F-106 Delta Dart and other suitably-equipped intercept aircraft to airborne targets.  AN/GRC-27 backup transceivers were used to cover frequencies that were lost due to outages of the main transmitters and receivers.  In addition to these, an AN/GKA-5 Time Division Data Link (TDDL) system was used to digitally provide the vectoring data to the intercept aircraft.

In addition to the defense mission, Boron AFS became a joint-use facility with the Federal Aviation Administration (FAA) for use in tracking aircraft in the Los Angeles sector.  By this time the AN/FPS-10 had been replaced by an AN/FPS-20 search radar. However, this radar was soon replaced by an AN/FPS-35 frequency diversity radar. By 1963 this radar operated with AN/FPS-26A and AN/FPS-90 height-finder radars.  Boron AFS was re-designated as NORAD ID Z-59 on 31 July 1963.

In 1968 the AN/FPS-90 was deactivated. In 1969 the AN/FPS-35 was removed, and was replaced by an AN/FPS-67 on the same tower (and with a radome); it became operational in 1970.

In addition to the main facility, Boron operated these AN/FPS-14 gap-filler sites:
 Minter Field Army Airfield (now Shafter Airport), Shafter, CA (P-59A) at 
 Copper Mountain, Joshua Tree, CA (P-76F, P-59C) at 

Over the years, the equipment at the station was upgraded or modified to improve the efficiency and accuracy of the information gathered by the radars.  The 750th Radar Squadron was inactivated on 30 June 1975. The FAA retained the AN/FPS-67, and continues to operate it today as part of the Joint Surveillance System (JSS).

In 1979, Boron AFS was converted into Federal Prison Camp, Boron, a minimum-security federal prison for male inmates that was closed in 2000.  The prison site and housing area have been completely demolished.  The U.S. Department of Justice is currently investigating trespass activity at FPC Boron. All identified instances of trespass are logged, and trespassers may be subject to federal and state prosecution including imprisonment and/or fines.

Air Force units and assignments

Units
 Constituted as the 750th Aircraft Control and Warning Squadron
 Activated at Edwards AFB, California on 8 October 1950
 Moved to Atolia, California on 28 January 1952
 Site redesignated Boron Air Force Station, 1 December 1953
 Redesignated 750th Radar Squadron (SAGE) on 1 May 1961
 Redesignated 750th Radar Squadron on 1 February 1974
 Inactivated on 30 June 1975

Assignments
 544th Aircraft Control and Warning Group, 1 January 1952
 27th Air Division, 6 February 1952
 Los Angeles Air Defense Sector, 1 October 1959
 27th Air Division, 1 April 1966
 26th Air Division, 19 November 1969 – 30 June 1975

See also
 United States general surveillance radar stations

References

 Cornett, Lloyd H. and Johnson, Mildred W., A Handbook of Aerospace Defense Organization  1946 – 1980, Office of History, Aerospace Defense Center, Peterson AFB, CO (1980).
 Mueller, Robert, Air Force Bases, Vol. I, Active Air Force Bases Within the United States of America on 17 September 1982, Office of Air Force History, Washington DC (1989) .
 Winkler, David F. & Webster, Julie L., Searching the Skies, The Legacy of the United States Cold War Defense Radar Program, US Army Construction Engineering Research Laboratories, Champaign, IL (1997).
 Information for Boron AFS, CA

Installations of the United States Air Force in California
Semi-Automatic Ground Environment sites
Aerospace Defense Command military installations
Military installations established in 1952
Military installations closed in 1975
1952 establishments in California
1975 disestablishments in California